Fafi or fa-fi (pronounced fah-fee), also known as mo-china, is a form of betting played mainly by black South Africans, particularly those living in townships, and is believed to have originated with South Africa's Chinese community. The game is similar to a numbers racket.

Playing fafi
Fafi participants choose the number they want to gamble on by interpreting their dreams.  This dream interpretation or conversion is based upon a variety of systems. When they have decided upon their lucky number, participants will then place a bet on their number.  A dream about robbers (izigebengu/amasela) may indicate the number 7.  

A dream about a white person (umLungu) is the number 1, whereas a dream about the sea could either indicate the number 3 for a ship (inqanawe) or 26, the number for water (amanzi).
The game requires a woman runner (isikhwama — bag) to take a bag of bets, along with the names of the betters and their money, to someone, usually Chinese, who visits the station (house) of the runner holding the betting session. The Chinese person will take the bag from the runner and then whisper the winning number to her.  The runner will then indicate with her hands to the betters which number has won, and that person will be paid out.

References

Gambling games